The Amnesty International UK Media Awards 1995  were awarded in five categories: National Print, Periodicals, Radio, Television Documentary and Television News. Two awards were given in the Television Documentary category.

The overall winner, and winner of the Television News category, was Sue Lloyd-Roberts, of BBC Breakfast, for her reporting on China's 'laogai' (labour camps). The awards were presented by Pierre Sané and hosted by Peter Snow.

References

External links
 Amnesty International UK (AIUK) website
 Amnesty International UK Media Awards at the AIUK Website
 Amnesty International Website

Amnesty International
British journalism awards
Human rights awards
1995 awards in the United Kingdom